Pollinator is the eleventh studio album by the American rock band Blondie, released on May 5, 2017 by BMG Rights Management.

Background 
The album returns to a more band-oriented sound following the group's experimentation with electronic music for their previous release Ghosts of Download. Many of the songs on the album were collaborations written by outside writers, including songs written by TV on the Radio's David Sitek, Johnny Marr, Sia, Nick Valensi from The Strokes, Charli XCX, Canadian YouTube personality Adam Johnston, a.k.a. YourMovieSucks (who records music under the name An Unkindness), and Dev Hynes. Five of the album's tracks were written or co-written by Blondie bandmembers, with two songs written by Debbie Harry and Chris Stein (Harry also co-wrote one track with Hynes) and another two were written by Blondie keyboardist Matt Katz-Bohen with his wife Laurel. Lead guitarist Chris Stein stated in an interview with Mojo, "We thought to ask people because there's so much good music swirling about", rather than it being a result of running thin on ideas. "We sorted the contributors ourselves, or someone would send us a bunch of songs and we'd pick one" he continued, explaining that Blondie and producer John Congleton had curated the submissions.

The album was officially announced on January 23, 2017, when the band uploaded to their social media a scan of an interview with Mojo magazine which confirmed the album's release date. On January 30, the album's cover and track listing were unveiled.

The album cover was designed by the visual artist Shepard Fairey.

Promotion 
The band's performance at WTTW's Grainger Studio in Chicago, taped on December 10, 2015, aired on the PBS concert series Soundstage on January 26, 2017, containing the new songs "My Monster" and "Gravity". "Fun" was released on February 1, 2017, as the album's lead single. On February 8, 2017, it was announced that Blondie will join Garbage on the co-headlining "Rage and Rapture Tour" across the United States, which will kick off on July 5 in Saratoga, California, wrapping up on August 12 in Dallas, Texas. A second track, "My Monster", was released as an iTunes instant grat, and made available to those who had pre-ordered the album, on February 19, 2017. "Fun" became Blondie's most successful single in years, rising to Number 1 on Billboard's Dance Club Songs (Blondie's first appearance on that chart since 1995) and many charts in other countries.

The second single, "Long Time", had its first play on Ken Bruce's show on BBC Radio 2 on March 21, and was released as a single on March 24. It was released on a limited edition 7" vinyl, as was "Fun", backed with non-album track "The Breaks". "Long Time" gave the band another Top 5 hit on the US Billboard Dance chart, their second from this album.

Later in April two more songs were released: "Fragments" and "Tonight". "Fragments", released for streaming only, is a song originally written and performed by Canadian YouTuber and musician Adam Johnston, who releases music under the name An Unkindness, that gained much attention during the Australian tour and was released as a promo track on YouTube. "Tonight" is a Charli XCX penned track, sung in duet with Laurie Anderson. It was released on a limited edition 1000 copies one-sided 7" pressing, sold at Blondie's pop up shop at the Camden Market as a promotional single. This song has also appeared on the CD edition of the album as a hidden-track after "Fragments".

On September 19, "Doom or Destiny" (featuring Joan Jett) was released as the album's fourth single, backed with a politically charged video directed by Rob Roth.

Tours 

In summer 2017, Blondie undertook a co-headlining tour of the US with the band Garbage, in which Debbie Harry appeared onstage in full Honey Bee regalia. In keeping with the Pollinator album, the costume was designed as a statement about the dwindling bee population and environmental health. A fledgling beekeeper herself, Harry also wore a full-length cape which declared: "STOP FUCKING THE PLANET" in large block letters.

Blondie toured for the album during 2017 and 2018, visiting several cities in the United States, Canada, United Kingdom, New Zealand, Australia, Germany, France, Ireland, Mexico, Brazil, Argentina and Cuba. A date in Chile was scheduled but later cancelled and rescheduled for 2019 and going sold-out in ten minutes. During July-August, 2017 Blondie co-headlined the "Rage and Rapture Tour" with Garbage, playing 27 shows in the US, Canada and Mexico.

In 2019, Blondie were invited to perform in Havana, Cuba as part of a cultural exchange through the Cuban Ministry of Culture. Director Rob Roth created the documentary Vivir en La Habana with recordings and interviews from this travel, which premiered in several festivals and produced the homonimous live EP.

The average setlist does not represent all of the shows of the tour. Other songs performed on the tour included "Doom or Destiny", "Tonight" and "Best Day Ever" from Pollinator, "Picture This" and "Fade Away and Radiate" from Parallel Lines, "A Rose by Any Name" and "Euphoria" from Ghosts of Download, "In the Flesh" from Blondie and "The Tide Is High" from Autoamerican. Covers of "Rainy Day Women ♯12 & 35", "I Feel Love", "My Heart Will Go On", "Paranoid" and "You Can't Put Your Arms Around a Memory" were also performed.

Critical reception 

At Metacritic, the album has score of 71 out of 100, based on 22 reviews, indicating "generally favorable" reviews. Critics generally commented on the big number of collaborators and compositors, lamenting the few only Harry-Stein-penned tracks, and praised Congleton's production and Harry's interpretation.

Jon Dolan from Rolling Stone said that "Each [collaborator] puts their own reverent spin on the band’s vintage neon Nu Yawk garage rock, as 71-year-old Debbie Harry has a catty good time all over the place." In an A- review, Robert Christgau pointed at the tension between Harry's age (which people would normally consider old) and her youthful and energetic attitude: "Any youngish person who doesn't buy her «Take me back home again/I wanna make love again,» not to mention 53-year-old Johnny Marr's «Human beings are stupid things when we're young,» has much to learn about the aging process in this ever-changing world we hope we all age in". Stephen Thomas Erlewine from AllMusic highlighted the balance between the effort to dialogue with modern sounds and the intention to be faithful to the identity of the band,

Dave Simpson from The Guardian celebrated Burke's drumming and Harry's warm delivery. Maura Johnston from Pitchfork higlighted "Fragments," the closing track, stating that: "It’s part «Is That All There Is,» part defiant wave goodbye—and it’s a fitting close to an album that shows one of the most crucial American rock bands searching for footing in a chaotic, collapsible pop landscape." "Long Time," "Fun," "Doom or Destiny,” "Best Day Ever," "Gravity," and "My Monster" were generally the most picked tracks.

Commercial performance 
Pollinator has charted higher in most regions than their previous three albums. The album debuted and peaked at number 4 in the United Kingdom, the band's ninth Top 10 album and seventh Top 5 there (and their first since 1999's No Exit). As of July 2017, the album has sold 24,206 copies in the UK. The album also debuted at number 1 in the UK Independent Albums Chart, and remained in the top 50 for 16 consecutive weeks. In the United States, the album debuted and peaked at number 63 on the Billboard 200, also the band's highest charting album in their native country since 1999. The album was more prominent on Billboards Top Independent Albums Chart where it debuted and peaked at number 4. In Australia, the album peaked at number 29.

 Track listing 

 Short film and EP Vivir en La Habana 

In 2019, Blondie were invited to perform in Havana, Cuba as part of a cultural exchange through the Cuban Ministry of Culture. This experience was documented by director Rob Roth in the short film Blondie: Vivir en La Habana, which featured 16mm, 8mm film and digital footage from the shows and the band members around Havanna and interviews. Guitarist Chris Stein couldn't travel but is present in footage shot in New York. The film is divided into three segments: "Water", "Fire" and "Air", which present a meditation on the experience as well as highlights from the two-night live musical performances with special guests Alain Perez, David Torrens and Afro-Cuban rock band Sintesis at Havana’s Teatro Mella.

The short film made the selection of several film festivals in 2021, such as In-Edit Festival (Spain), Rizoma Festival (Spain), Tribeca Film Festival 2021 (United States), Sheffield DocFest 2021 (England), Reykjavik International Film Festival 2021 (Iceland), Sonoma International Film Festival 2022 (United States), BBC's LongShots 2022 (United Kingdom).

An EP, entitled Vivir en La Habana, was released in July 2021 in vinyl and streaming. It consists of recordings of six live tracks from the Cuba shows with extra guitars added by Stein in a New York studio.

 Personnel BlondieDebbie Harry – vocals
Chris Stein – guitar
Clem Burke – drums
Leigh Foxx – bass guitar
Matt Katz-Bohen – keyboards
Tommy Kessler – guitarAdditional personnelGreg Calbi – Mastering engineer
John Congleton – production
Rich Costey – Mix engineer
Gregory Brothers – backing vocals on "When I Gave Up on You"
Kabir Hermon – Studio engineer
Tony Hoffer – Additional production on tracks 1/2/4/10
Joan Jett – backing vocals on "Doom or Destiny"
Johnny Marr – guitar
John Roberts – backing vocals on "Love Level"
Nick Valensi – guitar
What Cheer? Brigade – horns and drums on "Love Level"Vivir en La Habana personnel'

Tom Camuso and Steve Rosenthal– Mixing engineers
Tom Heinisch – Recording engineer
Michael Graves – Mastering engineer
Blondie and Steve Rosenthal – Producers
Chris Stein, Debbie Harry, Clem Burke and Tommy Manzi – Executive producers
Carlos Alfonso, Ele Valdés, María del Carme Ávila, Alejandro Delgado, Juan Carlos Marín, Jamil Schery, Degnis Bofill, Adel González – Side musicians on "The Tide is High" and "Rapture"

Charts

References 

2017 albums
Blondie (band) albums
Infectious Music albums
BMG Rights Management albums
Albums produced by John Congleton